The 1957–58 Liga Bet season saw Hapoel Tiberias and Hapoel Ramla win their respective regional divisions. However, there was no promotion to Liga Alef or relegation to Liga Gimel, after the Israel Football Association decided to abandon the league before the end of the season, due to suspicions of bribery.

North Division

South Division

See also
1957–58 Liga Alef

References
This week tables (Page 1) Hadshot HaSport, 11 May 1958, archive.football.co.il 

Liga Bet seasons
Israel
3